Ole Didrik Blomberg (born 12 June 2000) is a Norwegian football defender who plays for SK Brann.

Hailing from Bergen, he played for Gneist in the 3. divisjon and 4. divisjon before being picked up by Åsane. Winning promotion from the 2019 2. divisjon, he also performed well in the 2020 1. divisjon and was bought by city greats Brann. He made his Eliteserien debut in October 2020 against Molde.

References

2000 births
Living people
Footballers from Bergen
Norwegian footballers
Åsane Fotball players
SK Brann players
Norwegian First Division players
Eliteserien players
Association football defenders